Nordvest FC was a Danish association football club. They played their home matches at Holbæk Stadion in Holbæk, which has a capacity of 10,000 (1,100 seats). Nordvest FC was the professional structure comprising the first team of the mother club, Holbæk B&I (HB&I), and officially took effect on July 1, 2008. The professional structure was abandoned in June 2014 and the first team of the club went back to using the original name, Holbæk B&I.

Current squad
Up to date as of 2012-01-05

References

Football clubs in Denmark
Association football clubs established in 2008
2008 establishments in Denmark
Holbæk